William David McElroy (22 January 1917 – 17 February 1999) was an American biochemist and academic administrator.

Biography

Early years
McElroy was born to William D. McElroy and Ora Shipley in Rogers, Texas. After graduating from McAllen High School in McAllen, Texas in 1935, he attended Pasadena Junior College in California, and went on to Stanford University on a football scholarship where he received his bachelor's degree in 1937. He earned his master's degree in biology at Reed College and his PhD at Princeton University in 1943.

Career
After college, McElroy became a professor at Johns Hopkins University. He initiated an independent research program in bioluminescence, recruiting students to collect fireflies to perform experiments. He discovered the key role that luciferase and adenosine triphosphate (ATP) play in the process.

He began working with the Office of Naval Research and the National Institute of Health in the 1950s, and became a member of the President's Science Advisory Committee to President John F. Kennedy in 1962. He later became the director of the National Science Foundation from 1969 to 1972. He also served as the president of the American Association for the Advancement of Science from 1975 to 1976. He became chancellor of the University of California San Diego from 1972 to 1980.

In collaboration with H. Bentley Glass he edited several symposium volumes, including The chemical basis of heredity, with authors including François Jacob, Erwin Chargaff, Severo Ochoa, Arthur Kornberg, Max Delbrück and Francis Crick. In his review Conrad Waddington wrote as follows:
It deals with the most fundamental problem of analytical biology — the chemical nature and functioning of the basic units on which biological organisms are based. The contributors are ... of the very highest standard ... Workers in the large field of chromosomes, genes, nucleic acids and viruses will find the book essential.

He was awarded the Howard N. Potts Medal in 1971. He was also an elected member of the American Academy of Arts and Sciences, the United States National Academy of Sciences, and the American Philosophical Society.

In 1981, McElroy became a founding member of the World Cultural Council.

Personal life
McElroy married three times. He was first married to Nella Amelia Winch in 1940 with whom he had four children; Ann, Mary, Thomas and William, Jr. His second marriage was in 1967 to biochemist Marlene Anderegg DeLuca. Their one child is Eric Gene. After being widowed in 1987, he remarried again in 1997 to Olga Robles who survived him.

Honors
McElroy Ridge in the Victory Mountains of Victoria Land, Antarctica was named after McElroy by the Advisory Committee on Antarctic Names.

References

External links 
 William D. McElroy Papers MSS 483. Special Collections & Archives, UC San Diego Library.

1917 births
1999 deaths
People from Rogers, Texas
American biochemists
Chancellors of the University of California, San Diego
Founding members of the World Cultural Council
United States National Science Foundation officials
Pasadena City College alumni
Princeton University alumni
Reed College alumni
Stanford University alumni
Johns Hopkins University faculty
Howard N. Potts Medal recipients
Nixon administration personnel
Members of the American Philosophical Society